Jonathan Stenbäcken (born 7 January 1988) is a Swedish former handball player, who last played for IK Sävehof and the Swedish national team. Since 2022 he is Sports Manager for IK Sävehof.

He participated on the Sweden men's national handball team at the 2016 Summer Olympics in Rio de Janeiro, in the men's handball tournament.

His uncle is former handball player Joachim Stenbäcken.

References

1988 births
Living people
Swedish male handball players
Olympic handball players of Sweden
Handball players at the 2016 Summer Olympics
Expatriate handball players
Swedish expatriate sportspeople in Germany
Handball-Bundesliga players
IFK Kristianstad players
People from Vårgårda Municipality
IK Sävehof players
Sportspeople from Västra Götaland County
21st-century Swedish people